From April 27–29, 1912, a major tornado outbreak generated at least six violent tornadoes in Oklahoma, with near-constant activity until early the next day. At least 15 cities were affected, 40 people died, and 120 others were injured. Tornado researcher Thomas P. Grazulis considered this outbreak to be among the worst on record in the state of Oklahoma, as measured by fatalities and violent tornadoes. At least five strong tornadoes affected Washita County, Oklahoma, during this outbreak.

Background
Limited weather data were collected and recorded at that time in Oklahoma. Antedating upper atmospheric measurements, most data collection was of human observations, along with temperature, pressure, wind speed and direction, and rainfall. A cold front moved south through Oklahoma into Texas on April 26, before stalling as a stationary front draped across Central Texas, oriented from northeast to southwest. Early on April 27, it pushed back northward against a warm front to the east, due to a vigorous upper-atmospheric trough approaching from the west. The warm front was noted to have moved from the southeast on April 27 to the northeast on April 28; this movement of warm air against the cold front, in proximity to a low-pressure area over western Oklahoma, provided sufficient atmospheric lift, thereby fuelling the storms that provided the tornado activity.

Confirmed tornadoes

April 27 event

April 28 event

April 29 event

See also
List of North American tornadoes and tornado outbreaks
Tornado outbreak of April 20–22, 1912 – Similarly severe outbreak impacted much of the same region

Notes

References

Sources

Oklahoma
Tornadoes in Oklahoma
F4 tornadoes by date
Oklahoma,1912-04-27
History of Oklahoma
1912 in Oklahoma
1912 natural disasters in the United States
Tornado outbreak